Juan-les-Pins station (French: Gare de Juan-les-Pins) is a railway station serving the town of Juan-les-Pins, part of the commune of Antibes, in the Alpes-Maritimes department, southeastern France. It is situated on the Marseille–Ventimiglia railway, between Cannes and Nice. Trains pass through this station between 5am and 1am daily. The station is served by regional trains (TER Provence-Alpes-Côte d'Azur) to Cannes, Grasse, Antibes and Nice.

References

Railway stations in Alpes-Maritimes
Antibes